Katja Wühler (born 19 January 1979 in Erfurt) is a German volleyball player.
She was a member of the Germany women's national volleyball team. She participated in the 2003 FIVB World Grand Prix.

Club 
Katja Wühler started volleyball in her hometown of Erfurt before joining Bundesliga club Dresdner SC in 1995. In 1999, they were German champion and winner of the DVV Cup. 
In 2001, the universal player moved to the Rote Raben Vilsbiburg, with whom she became German champion in 2008. In 2009, she won the DVV Cup, became German runner-up and reached the Final Four at the 2008–09 Women's CEV Cup. In 2010,  Katja Wühler repeated with the Red Ravens, the German championship and then ended hir active career.

Today Katja Wühler works for the Red Ravens in the office and as a trainer.

References

External links 
 Player profile FIVB
 Player profile CEV

1979 births
Living people
Dresdner SC athletes
German women's volleyball players
Sportspeople from Erfurt